Parliament of Libya may refer to:

General People's Congress (Libya) (1977–2011)
General National Congress (2012–2014, 2014–2016)
House of Representatives (Libya) (since 2014)
High Council of State (Libya) (since 2016)